The 2012 Villaggio Mall fire occurred at 11:30 on May 28, 2012 in Villaggio Mall, Doha, Qatar. The fire left at least 19 people dead and another 17 were injured. The fire is reported as having started in the facility's nursery, and 13 of the victims were children. Five people were later found guilty of death by negligence after the blaze.

The Villaggio Mall was set to be reopened in 20 September, 2012.

Fire
The fire started in the Gympanzee daycare with electrical fault at 11:05. A few moments later, a fire quickly spread through the mall before the police and the firefighters coming. In 11:34, there are so many Doha firefighters started to extinguishing a fire inside Doha shopping mall blaze.

References

2012 fires in Asia
2012 in Qatar
21st century in Doha
Department store fires
May 2012 events in Asia